= Talwandi Araian =

- Village
- Location in Punjab, India Talwandi Araian (India)
- Coordinates: 31.518872°N 75.7404702°E
- Country: India
- State: Punjab
- District: Jalandhar
- Tehsil: Jalandhar - I

Government
  - Type: Panchayat raj
  - Body: Gram panchayat

Area
  - Total: 274 ha (680 acres)

Population (2011)
  - Total: 641; 304/337 ♂/♀
  - Scheduled Castes: 460; 220/240 ♂/♀
  - Total Households: 134

Languages
  - Official: Punjabi
- Time zone: UTC+5:30 (IST)
- Telephone: 144102
- ISO 3166 code: IN-PB
- Vehicle registration: PB-08
- Post office: Adampur Doaba S.O
- Website: jalandhar.gov.in

Talwandi Araian is a village in Jalandhar - I in Jalandhar district of Punjab State, India. It is located 20 kilometres (12 mi) from district headquarter. The village is administrated by Sarpanch an elected representative of the village.

== Demography ==
As of 2011, the village has a total number of 134 houses and a population of 641 of which 304 are males while 337 are females. According to the report published by Census India in 2011, out of the total population of the village 460 people are from Schedule Caste and the village does not have any Schedule Tribe population so far.

== See also ==
- List of villages in India
